Juan Gutiérrez de Padilla (ca. 15901664) was a Renaissance-style Spanish composer, most of whose career took place in Mexico.

Life and career
He was born in Málaga, Spain. He moved to Puebla, Mexico, in 1620. At the time New Spain was a viceroyalty of Spain that included modern day Mexico, Guatemala, the Philippines and other parts of Central America and the Caribbean. Padilla is one of the more important composers represented in the manuscripts at Puebla, Mexico and the Hackenberry collection in Chicago, Illinois. He worked at Puebla de Los Angeles, Mexico, which in the 17th century was a bigger religious center than Mexico City itself. He was appointed maestro de capilla of Puebla Cathedral in 1628. The Mexican composer Juan García de Zéspedes was a boy soprano in the cathedral choir under Padilla, and later succeeded him to the office of maestro in 1664.

He is to be distinguished from a younger Juan de Padilla, who was maestro de capilla at Zamora, Spain (1661-1663), and Toledo (1663-1673).

Works
The majority of his vast output (over 700 pieces survive) include sacred motets, often for double choir, in the Renaissance style or stile antico as well as sacred villancicos. It often includes accompaniments for organ or various stringed instruments.

Bibliography
Padilla's music is rather difficult to get hold of:
Mapa Mundi, publish singing scores of some of this music including the double choir piece Deus in Adiutorium Meum Intende. Alfredston Music can provide instrumental parts for the smaller pieces in their collection.

There are at least 2 Ph.D. theses with Padilla's music in the appendices:
S. Barwick, Sacred Vocal Polyphony in Early Colonial Mexico, (diss., Harvard Univ., 1949), includes the 2nd St. Matthew Passion; and A. Ray / A. R. Catalyne, The Double-choir Music of Juan de Padilla, (diss., Univ. of Southern California, 1953).

Recordings
Mirabilia testimonium. Lamentation for Maundy Thursday. Salve Regina on Masterpieces of Mexican Polyphony Westminster Cathedral Choir dir. James O'Donnell. Hyperion CDA66330 1989
Lamentation for Maundy Thursday on Lamentations of Jeremiah by The Tallis Scholars, dir. Peter Phillips. Gimell CDGIM 043 2010
Missa Ego Flos Campi, along with a number of secular works have been recorded by The Harp Consort, conducted by Andrew Lawrence-King, on the disc Missa Mexicana [2003].

Benjamín Juárez Echenique has recorded a Mass and two sets of Christmas villancicos for Urtext digital classics: 
Padilla; Maitines de Natividad 1652 (Mexican Baroque, Vol. 7) Angelicum de Puebla, dir. Echenique Urtext UMA2011 46'07"
Padilla; Maitines de Natividad 1653 (Baroque Mexico, Vol. 1) Angelicum de Puebla, dir. Echenique Urtext UMA2004
Padilla; Missa Ego flos campi (excerpts) 1653 (Baroque Mexico, Vol. 3) Angelicum de Puebla, dir. Echenique Urtext  UMA2005 1996
Padilla; "Streams of Tears". Missa Ave Regina and motets. The Sixteen, Harry Christophers COR16059

References

External links

Spanish Baroque composers
Mexican male classical composers
Mexican classical composers
Spanish male classical composers
1590s births
1664 deaths
History of Puebla
People from Málaga
People from Puebla
17th-century classical composers
17th-century Mexican people
17th-century male musicians